The Zhejiang and Fujian Meeting Hall
() is a historical Qing- Dynasty building in the City of Jinan, Shandong Province, China. It served as a meeting hall for traders form Zhejiang and Fujian living in Jinan and is the last remaining structure of its kind in the city. It illustrates the importance of Jinan as a trading center in the second half of the 19th century.

Historical background

The city of Jinan has been one of the major transportation and trading
centers in the north of China for long time, particularly so after the
Yellow River shifted its bed to the immediate north of the city in
1852. As a consequence, traders from other regions of China came to
Jinan and established their businesses there. Groups of traders from
the same home region set up meeting halls in order to make themselves
feel at home, provide a convenient location for their business
activities, foster collaboration among themselves, and protect their
common business interests. In total, Jinan had more than 10 meeting
halls for traders from regions over the country. Over the years most
of these buildings were either converted to serve other purposes,
deteriorated, or were torn down. The meeting hall of the traders from
Zhejiang (abbreviated as "Zhe" in the hall's Chinese name) and Fujian (abbreviated as "Min" in the hall's Chinese name) is the last existing meeting hall in
Jinan. It was established in 1873 during the late Qing Dynasty by
a trader from Fujian who also held a government office. Since losing its
function as a meeting hall, the building has been used as a boarding house, a morgue, as storage for
old books (1960's) and as a factory building (1970's). The building was declared a key historical
site by the City of Jinan in 1979. On October 16, 2007, the renovated hall was reopen as a center where senior citizens can practice arts such as calligraphy and painting.

Architectural layout

The meeting hall served as a gathering place on every major
festival. On these occasions, the traders from Fujian and Zhejiang
would use it for religious observances, to discuss business, to dine,
and to attend theater performances.

The meeting hall has a wooden framework supported by large wooden
pillars. Overall the building complex is about 80 meters deep and 30 meters wide
. Its roof is covered with small green tiles. Originally,
the hall had two gates, a north gate leading to the Kuan Hou Suo Alley
and a south gate leading to the Southern Ma Dao Jie (now renamed to
"Black Tiger Spring West Road"). The north gate has been closed off in
1956, since then, since then only the south gate is being used. The
meeting hall has two main halls, one located directly behind the gate
house of the southern entrance gate and the theater hall right to the
north of it. The two halls are separated by a wooden screen that can
be opened to create one big hall to accommodate large functions. The
theater hall is supported by six pillars and consists of five
half-open rooms. The stage (approximately 6 meters wide and 4 meters deep) is located to the north of the hall with
seating areas arranged along the east, west, and south sides of the
hall. Wooden staircases lead up to the first floor on the east and
west sides of the hall. Behind the stage lies a small changing room
for the actors.

Location

The Zhejiang and Fujian Traders Meeting Hall is located in Lixia
District, within the historical city center of Jinan, north of the
southern city moat.
Lixia District, Jinan.

See also
List of sites in Jinan

References

Buildings and structures in Shandong